Bråten is a surname. Notable people with the surname include:

Elsa Rastad Bråten (1918–1999), Norwegian politician
Gjermund Bråten (born 1990), Norwegian snowboarder
Ingebjørg Saglien Bråten (born 1999), Norwegian ski jumper
Johannes Bråten (1920–1997), Norwegian politician
Knut Aastad Bråten (born 1976), Norwegian magazine editor
Øystein Bråten (born 1995), Norwegian freestyle skier
Stein Bråten (born 1934), Norwegian sociologist and social psychologist
Steinar Bråten (born 1962), Norwegian former ski jumper